Metlili (also known as Metlili ) is a town and commune, and capital of Métlili District, in Ghardaïa Province, Algeria. According to the 2008 census it has a population of 40,576, up from 33,759 in 1998, and an annual growth rate of 1.9%.

The population is called Chaanbas (الشعانبة). They descend from the Banu Sulaym Arab tribe. They migrated from Arabia (south of Medina) along with the Banu Hilal tribe in the year 975 AD to Northern Egypt and then in about 1051 AD to north Africa: Libya, Tunisia, Algeria, Morocco.

Geography

Climate

Metlili has a hot desert climate (Köppen climate classification BWh), with very hot summers and mild winters, and very little precipitation throughout the year.

Transportation

Metlili lies on the N107, a road which connects Noumerat Airport near Ghardaïa in the east to El Bayadh to the northwest. A local road leads south from the town to Sebseb.

Education

8.2% of the population has a tertiary education (the highest in the province), and another 21.7% has completed secondary education. The overall literacy rate is 83.4%, and is 88.6% among males and 78.1% among females.

Localities
The commune of Metlili is composed of seven localities:

Centre de Metlili
Noumerat
Guemgouma
El Hadika
Souani
Chabet Sidi Cheikh
Souareg
Chouiket Est

Notable people from Metlili

 Ahmed Benbitour, former Prime Minister of Algeria and world-renowned economist and former adviser to the director of the World Bank
 Mustapha Benbada,  Minister of Trade.
 Bachir Messaitfa, Professor Specializing in sc. Economic.

References

Neighbouring towns and cities

Communes of Ghardaïa Province
Algeria
Cities in Algeria